Motike is a village in the municipality of Banja Luka, Republika Srpska, Bosnia and Herzegovina.

On 7 February 1942, Ustaše paramilitaries, led by a Franciscan monk, Miroslav Filipović (aka Tomislav Filipović-Majstorović), killed more than 2,300 Serbs (among them 500 children) in Drakulić, Motike and Šargovac.

References

Villages in Republika Srpska
Populated places in Banja Luka